Bess Kargman is an American filmmaker and director, most famous for her 2011 film First Position.

Early life 
Kargman grew up in Brookline, Massachusetts with two siblings, Harry and Sophie. She studied at Boston Ballet for almost a decade and attended the Shady Hill School. She stopped ballet and began playing competitive ice hockey. She attended high school at Concord Academy in Concord, Massachusetts before studying fine arts and playing varsity ice hockey at Amherst College.

Career 
After graduating from Amherst, Kargman moved to New York City, where she earned her real estate license and took night classes in op-ed writing. In 2006, she published her first op-ed in The Washington Post and later enrolled in Columbia University School of Journalism, where she earned a concentration in documentary and new media studies.

After she graduated journalism school, the recession hit and Kargman worked as an unpaid intern at a production company, where she found her inspiration for her future film, First Position. To create the film, she started her own production company and hired a crew.

First Position 
For First Position, Kargman spent over a year following six young ballet dancers from around the world as they prepared for the 2010 Youth America Grand Prix finals in New York City. The documentary was picked up by Sundance Selects/IFC Films and premiered at the 2011 Toronto International Film Festival and later in nearly 200 theaters. First Position was a hit among film critics, at film festivals, and with audiences, and it has won various awards, including both the Audience Award and Best New Director at the Portland International Film Festival, the Audience Award at the Dallas International Film Festival, and the Jury Prize at the San Francisco Documentary Film Festival. It received 93% on Rotten Tomatoes.

COACH 
In 2013, Kargman directed and edited an ESPN Films documentary short COACH about legendary Rutgers University women's basketball coach C. Vivian Stringer as a part of ESPN's "Nine for IX" series, for which Whoopi Goldberg served as executive producer. COACH won Best Documentary Short at the 2013 Tribeca Film Festival and received a nomination for a Sports Emmy.

Other projects 
Kargman has directed and/or created documentary shorts for Teen Vogue, PBS, Major League Soccer, National Public Radio, and the NBC Olympics. She also directs commercials and creates content for companies around the world.

Kargman was selected as a fellow for the American Film Showcase, a program for the U.S. Department of State, to represent the United States.

Awards

References 

Living people
Year of birth missing (living people)
People from Massachusetts
American filmmakers
American directors
Columbia University School of General Studies alumni
Shady Hill School alumni